Monstera lechleriana is a flowering plant in the genus Monstera in the arum family, Araceae. It is considered to be a rare plant. However, a section of plant owners grows them as houseplants. A lightly rooted stem cutting can cost upwards of $200.

Uses 
It is used medicinally.

Distribution 
It is native to Bolivia, Brasil, Colombia, Ecuador, Panamá, Peru, and Venezuela.

References 

lechleriana
Plants described in 1860
Taxa named by Heinrich Wilhelm Schott
Flora of Bolivia
Flora of Colombia
Flora of Ecuador
Flora of Panama
Flora of Peru
Flora of Venezuela